The Ojinaga Cut is a parcel of land between Ojinaga, Chihuahua, and Presidio, Texas, that gave rise to an international border dispute between the United States and Mexico when the Rio Grande (Río Bravo del Norte) changed course. 

The situation was similar to the better known Chamizal dispute between El Paso, Texas, and Ciudad Juárez, Chihuahua. The Ojinaga conflict was resolved by the Boundary Treaty of 1970. The U.S. ceded  and Mexico ceded . The land that changed possession became known as the Ojinaga Cut.

See also
 U.S.-Mexico border
 Rio Grande border disputes

Geography of Mexico
International territorial disputes of the United States
Mexico–United States border